DBN may refer to:

 1,5-Diazabicyclo(4.3.0)non-5-ene, a chemical
 DBN1, a human gene
 Deep belief network, type of neural network
 Dynamic Bayesian network, a statistical model
 DBN (band), a German trio